Covered Market may refer to:

 Market hall a kind of indoor market.
 Covered Market, Oxford the indoor market in central Oxford, UK.
 Covered Market, Preston
 Covered Market, Metz the indoor market in central Metz, France.
 Valletta Market

Commercial buildings